Japura Airport  is a domestic airport located in Rengat, Riau, Indonesia. The airport serves Rengat and surrounding areas. This airport can accommodate some aircraft such as BAe 146, ATR 72, ATR 42, Fokker 50, and others.

Airlines and destinations

Statistics

References

Airports in Riau